Mary from Dungloe may refer to:

Mary from Dungloe (festival), an Irish music festival in Dungloe, County Donegal
"Mary from Dungloe" (song), an Irish song by Donegal stonemason Pádraig Mac Cumhaill in 1936